Ben Cunningham may refer to:

 Ben Cunningham (activist) (born 1947), American investor and anti-tax activist
 Ben Cunningham (artist) (1904–1975), American artist
 Ben Cunningham (Australian footballer) (born 1981), Australian footballer
 Ben Cunningham (hurler), Irish hurler
 Benny Cunningham (born 1990), American football running back
 Bennie Cunningham (1954–2018), American football tight end
 Benjamin Cunningham (1874–1946), American lawyer